FDI may refer to:

Finance
 fDi magazine, a British foreign direct investment publication
 Federal Deposit Insurance Corporation, a United States government corporation
 Foreign direct investment

Computing
 Field Device Integration, an International Electrotechnical Commission standards
 Flexible Display Interface
 Formatted Disk Image, part of the Unified emulator format

Health and medicine
 FDI World Dental Federation
 First dorsal interosseous

Other uses
 Fault detection and isolation
 Brothers of Italy (FdI, from the Italian name Fratelli d'Italia), an Italian political party
 Films Division of India, a government-owned film production company in India
 Foundation for Democracy in Iran, a US-based Iranian dissident organization

 Frégate de défense et d'intervention, a class of frigates of the French Navy